Fellows of the Entomological Society of New Zealand